George O'Brien may refer to:

George O'Brien (actor) (1899–1985), American film actor
George O'Brien (baseball) (1889–1966), American baseball player
George O'Brien (cricketer) (born 1984), Bermudian cricketer
George O'Brien (cyclist) (born 1931), British cyclist
George O'Brien (footballer, born 1935) (born 1935), Scottish football player for Dunfermline Athletic, Leeds United and Southampton
George O'Brien (1900s footballer), English football player for Manchester United
George O'Brien (Irish politician) (1892–1973), Irish politician, economist and academic
George O'Brien (painter) (1821–1888), New Zealand painter
George O'Brien (writer) (born 1945), Irish academic and writer of short fiction and memoir
George D. O'Brien (1900–1957), U.S. Representative from Michigan
G. Dennis O'Brien (born 1931), former president of the University of Rochester
George H. O'Brien Jr. (1926–2005), Korean War Medal of Honor recipient
George M. O'Brien (1917–1986), U.S. Representative from Illinois
George Thomas Michael O'Brien (1844–1906), governor of Fiji, governor of Hong Kong, High Commissioner for the Western Pacific
George O'Brien, a fictional politician in the Kingston Trio song "M.T.A."